Pyrsos Grevena F.C. is a Greek football club, based in Grevena.

Honors

Domestic Titles and honors

 Grevena FCA Champions: 4
 1993–94, 1999–00, 2009–10, 2016–17
 Grevena FCA Cup Winners: 4'''
 2011–12, 2012–13, 2016–17, 2017–18

Βest Seasons in teams History:

1970 – 1971: The team wins the promotion games for Division B for the first time in their history

1971 – 1972: Division B'

1972 – 1973: Division B' (relegation)

2007 – 2008: Division D : 1st place and promotion to the professional leagues

2008 – 2009: Division C

2009 – 2010: Division C and Phase2 of the Greek Cup

2010 – 2011: Due to financial problems, the team will play in Division D (amateur)

2011 – 2012: Division D

2012 – 2013: Division D

2013 – 2014: New Division C

2014 – 2015: New Division C  (more financial problems, have resulted in team's resignation from the championship)

2015 – ....... : Local League

External links
 

Football clubs in Western Macedonia
1928 establishments in Greece
Association football clubs established in 1928